Schiavelli is a surname. Notable people with the surname include:

 George P. Schiavelli (1948–2019), United States federal judge
 Vincent Schiavelli (1948–2005), American character actor and food writer

Italian-language surnames